Conan is a special operations military working dog in the United States 1st SFOD-D (Delta Force). He is a male Belgian Malinois and was named after late-night talk show host and comedian Conan O'Brien. He is a veteran canine of the United States Special Operations Command (SOCOM), and served in 50 combat missions.

Conan took part in the Barisha raid in Syria, which resulted in the death of Abu Bakr al-Baghdadi, the then-leader of the Islamic State of Iraq and the Levant (ISIL, ISIS) terror organization, on October 27, 2019. He chased Baghdadi down into a tunnel where the terror leader detonated his suicide vest. General Kenneth F. McKenzie Jr. stated on October 30, 2019 that the dog was injured during the raid due to exposed live electric wires, but had recovered and returned to field duty.

Identity 
President Donald Trump posted the declassified picture of Conan on Twitter and called him a "wonderful dog" in the tweet. His name was classified at the time, but it was revealed as Conan to Newsweek. A few days later, Trump also referred to the dog as Conan. Trump later re-tweeted a meme (photoshopped by The Daily Wire) of himself awarding Conan a dog version of a Medal of Honor.

After quickly garnering mainstream attention following the raid, merchandising with Conan's depiction and the slogan "Zero Bark Thirty" appeared online, a reference to Zero Dark Thirty, a film about the 2011 special operations raid targeting Osama bin Laden.

Conan's sex 
There were conflicting reports on Conan's sex following his reveal to the public. Newsweek initially reported that the dog is female, but the magazine later issued a correction which said Conan is male. RTL Nieuws reported that Conan was trained by a company in Best, Netherlands before being transported to the United States, and a man identified as his former owner and trainer was quoted as saying: "It is a five year old male. It is a very good dog."

On November 25, 2019, a White House official said the dog is female before issuing a correction, saying Conan is in fact male. The next day, defense officials confirmed with Stars and Stripes that Conan was male. At the same time, a U.S. defense official disputed this and told ABC News that Conan is female, but ABC's report was retracted a short time later with multiple officials saying they had verified that Conan is male.

The United States Special Operations Command (SOCOM) has contested a Freedom of Information Act request for records related to Conan's sex. SOCOM states that it can "neither confirm nor deny the existence or non existence of records," but if records exist, they would be a national security secret.

White House visit 

On November 25, 2019, Conan made a surprise appearance with a handler at the White House. The handler used dog commands in German during the meeting. President Donald Trump introduced Conan to reporters in the White House Rose Garden, saying, "So this is Conan. Right now, probably the world's most famous dog," going on to call him a "tough cookie" and "actually incredible" and "The Ultimate drug sniffer" and "Ultimate fighter". First Lady Melania Trump and Vice President Mike Pence attended the event as well, with Pence petting Conan and calling him a "hero" during brief remarks. President Trump stated that along with honoring Conan with a medal and a plaque, he met with some of the other special operations soldiers that participated in the Baghdadi raid, who were not identified for national security reasons as they were engaged in active duty.

See also 

 Chips, the most decorated war dog of World War II
 Sergeant Stubby, the most decorated war dog of World War I
 Lucca, Dickin Medal winning dog who served with U.S. Marines in Afghanistan
 List of individual dogs

Notes 

Dogs in warfare
Delta Force
Individual animals in the Netherlands
Individual dogs in the United States
Military animals
Conan O'Brien
2013 animal births